Matthew Louis Siegel is an American business executive and actor best known for the television series Brooklyn Bridge.

Siegel married Sara Friedlander, an International Director and Head of Post-War and Contemporary Art at Christie's in 2012.

Siegel is a Harvard University graduate and Columbia University's School of Public and International Affairs.  Siegel is currently the chief marketing officer and Head of Global Client Group of Aperture Investors. Siegel was previously the Chief Digital Officer of Roc Nation. He was formerly the CEO and Founder of Indaba Media, a music technology company based in Manhattan which was acquired by Splice.

References

External links

Living people
Harvard University alumni
American male child actors
American male television actors
American male film actors
American technology chief executives
Place of birth missing (living people)
School of International and Public Affairs, Columbia University alumni
Year of birth missing (living people)